In Paradisum is the debut and only album by multinational power metal band Symfonia, released on March 25, 2011 in Japan and April 1, 2011 in Europe. In paradisum (English: "Into paradise") is an antiphon from the traditional Latin liturgy of the Roman Catholic Requiem Mass.

The album was written by vocalist Andre Matos and guitarist Timo Tolkki, with the former focusing on lyrics and the latter focusing on the music, and both having some input on each other's parts.

The drums were recorded in two days by Uli Kusch in a separate studio, with the guitars, bass and keyboards being recorded in Helsinki. Work on vocals started on the first day of 2011 in a cabin on top of a mountain where Matos and Tolkki kept isolated with no internet or telephone.

Regarding the music of the album, Matos said:

In Paradisum was mixed in Italy.

Track listing
All songs written by Timo Tolkki and Andre Matos.
 "Fields of Avalon" (5:09)
 "Come by the Hills" (5:01)
 "Santiago" (5:54)
 "Alayna" (6:17)
 "Forevermore" (5:31)
 "Pilgrim Road" (3:37)
 "In Paradisum" (9:35)
 "Rhapsody in Black" (4:34)
 "I Walk in Neon" (5:44)
 "Don't Let Me Go" (3:56)
 "I'll Find My Way Home" (4:44) (Japanese bonus track)

Personnel 
 Andre Matos – vocals
 Timo Tolkki – guitars, production, mixing
 Jari Kainulainen – bass
 Mikko Härkin – keyboards
 Uli Kusch – drums
Giovanni Nebbia – mixing, editing, engineer  – mix engineer on "I'll Find My Way Home"
Maor Appelbaum – mastering engineer

References

2011 debut albums
Symfonia albums